Hussain Hakem (born 26 June 1984) is a Kuwaiti footballer who is a 
defender for the Kuwaiti Premier League club Al Kuwait.

Hakem's most valuable goal came in the Final of the 2009 AFC Cup, the goal came in the 16th minute of the first half.

References

1984 births
Living people
Kuwaiti footballers
Sportspeople from Kuwait City
Association football defenders
AFC Cup winning players
Kuwait international footballers
Kuwait SC players
Kuwait Premier League players